Bhashya is a "commentary" or "exposition" of any primary or secondary text in ancient or medieval Indian literature. Common in Sanskrit literature, Bhashya is also found in other Indian languages such as Tamil. Bhashya are found in various fields, ranging from the Upanishads to the Sutras of Hindu schools of philosophy, from ancient medicine to music.

The Indian tradition typically followed certain guidelines in preparing a Bhashya. These commentaries give meaning of words, particularly when they are about condensed aphoristic Sutras, supplementing the interpreted meaning with additional information on the subjects. A traditional Bhasya would, like modern scholarship, name the earlier texts (cite) and often include quotes from previous authors. The author of the Bhasya would also provide verification, acceptance or rejection of the text as interpreted, with reasons, and usually include a conclusion. The title of a commentary work sometimes has the title of the text commented on, with the suffix "-Bhashya".

Among the earliest known Bhashya are the Maha-bhashya of Patanjali from the 2nd century BCE, and Sabara Bhashya of the Mimamsa school of Hinduism, dated to have been likely composed between 100 BCE and 200 CE, but no later than the 5th century. An example of Buddhist literature Bhashya is Vasubandhu's Abhidharmakośa-Bhāṣya.

Etymology
The term bhashya literally means "speaking, talking, any work in the current, vernacular speech". The term also refers to, states Monier-Williams, any "explanatory work, exposition, explanation, commentary" that brings to light something else. A bhashyakrit is the author, and these words are related to the root bhash which means "speak about, describe, declare, tell". (Cf. the productive ending -ology in English, which derives from the Greek verb λεγῶ (legō), meaning "speak".)

Discussion
A typical Bhashya would be an interpretation of a Sutra or other classical work word by word. It can also consist of word by word translations and the individual viewpoint of the commentator or Bhashyakara.

There are numerous Bhashyas available on various Sanskrit and non-Sanskrit works. A few examples are Brahma Sutra Bhashya by Sri Madhvacharya and Sri Adi Shankara, Gita Bhashya and Sri Bhashya by Sri Ramanuja and Mahabhashya by Patañjali.

Tamil literary tradition

Following the Sanskrit literary tradition, commentaries to literary works remain one of the most important and telling aspects of the Tamil literary tradition. Commentaries to ancient Tamil works have been written since the medieval period and continue to be written in the modern era. Many ancient Tamil works continue to remain in comprehension chiefly due to exegesis or commentaries written on them. The most famous examples of such works are the Tolkappiyam and the Tirukkural, with the latter remaining the most reviewed work in the Tamil literature. According to K. Mohanraj, as of 2013, there were at least 497 Tamil commentaries on the Tirukkural written by 382 scholars beginning with Manakkudavar from the Medieval era, of whom at least 277 scholars have written commentaries for the entire work.

Nakkeerar, Ilampooranar, Senavaraiyar, Paerasiriyar, Deivachilaiyar, Nacchinarkkiniyar, Manakkudavar, Paridhiyar, Parimelalhagar, Kalladar, and Adiyarkku Nallar are some of the most celebrated commentators in the history of Tamil literature, all of whose works are praised on par with the original works to which they wrote exegeses.

See also 
 Works of Madhvacharya
 Works of Adi Shankara
 Ten medieval commentators

References

External links
Sri Bhashya Ramanuja
Chandogya Upanishad with Shankara Bhasya, GN Jha (Translator)
 Adhyasa Bhashyam audio of Adisankaracharya (Dr.Goli)

Literary terminology
Sanskrit literature
Sanskrit words and phrases